The Fruit Is Ripe is a 1977 German softcore erotic comedy film directed by Sigi Rothemund.

Plot
Patricia (Betty Vergès) is a young woman from a wealthy family in Greece who is bound to Munich for college. At the airport, she gives away her ticket and instead begins to hitchhike around Greece by automobile and boat in a journey of self-discovery. In the course of her travels, she becomes an object of desire. She's pursued by several suitors, but she turns them all down until she falls for Tom (Claus Richt), a sailor with whom she tours the Aegean. Tom leaves her after a fight, but eventually comes back to her.

Cast 
 Betty Vergès as Patricia
 Claus Richt as Tom
 Olivia Pascal as Amanda
 Wolf Goldan as Bernd

External links 

1970s sex comedy films
1977 films
1970s German-language films
German sex comedy films
West German films
Sexploitation films
Softcore pornography
Films directed by Sigi Rothemund
1977 comedy films
Films shot in Hydra
1970s German films